Áns saga bogsveigis, the saga of Án the bow-bender, is one of the legendary sagas called the Hrafnistumannasögur surrounding the relatives of Ketil Trout. It concerns a feud between An the Bow-bender and Ingjald, king of Namdalen.

It was probably written in the 14th century.

References
 "The Saga of Án Bow-Bender" (transl. Shaun Hughes, in Thomas H. Ohlgren, ed. Medieval Outlaws: Twelve Tales in Modern English. West Lafayette, Indiana: Parlor Press, 2005.)
 The Saga of Aun the Bow-Bender (transl. Willard Larson. Baltimore: Gateway Press, 1995.)
 "The Saga of An Bow-Bender", in The Hrafnista Sagas (transl. Ben Waggoner. The Troth. 2009)

External links
The saga in Old Norse at Snerpa
 The saga in Old Norse at Northvegr
The saga in Old Norse at Northvegr
The saga in Old Norse at «Norrøne Tekster og Kvad»
The saga in Old Norse at «Norrøne Tekster og Kvad»
The saga in translation

14th-century literature
Legendary sagas